The Porsanger Battalion is an armoured reconnaissance unit of the Norwegian Army. The battalion is based in Garrison of Porsanger, as part of Finnmark Land Command.

History 
The Battalion was established May 1st 2020.

Current organisation 
Porsanger Battalion is broken into the following structure
 Battalion Headquarters based at Garrison of Porsanger
 2nd Armoured Reconnaissance Squadron 
 6th Combat Support Squadron

References 

Battalions of Norway
Army reconnaissance units and formations
Military units and formations established in 2020
2020 establishments in Norway
Porsanger